Lake Sherburne Dam is a  high compacted earthfill dam built between 1914 and 1921 built just outside the boundary of Glacier National Park, Montana, its reservoir extending into the park. The dam impounds Swiftcurrent Creek as it flows out of the park. Water stored in Lake Sherburne is released to flow down Swiftcurrent Creek to the St. Mary River, from which it is diverted to the Milk River, flowing through Canada for  before returning to the United States.  Use of these waters is governed by the Boundary Waters Treaty of 1909. Water from the Milk River is used for irrigation in north central Montana.

Construction
The principal storage facility for the Milk River Project was initially intended to be a dam on the St. Mary Lakes (Upper St. Mary Lake in Glacier National Park and Lower St. Mary Lake just east of the park), but no suitable damsite could be found. The Sherburne Lakes in Swiftcurrent Valley were selected as an alternate site, with work beginning in 1914. Building material was borrowed from the upper end of the Sherburne Lakes. In order to expedite transportation of materials, a small tug boat and several barges were purchased for $1900 and hauled overland from Seattle to the project site. Work continued through 1915 and 1916. Swiftcurrent Creek was diverted through the dam's outlet works in April 1916. Work was hampered by delays from spring flooding. The outlet tower and gatehouse were built in 1917, together with the spillway. In October observations indicated that the spillway was being displaced by a slide originating in a hill to the north of the spillway. Drainage of lakes above the slide did not cure the problem. Work on the dam and its control works continued through 1918, but the spillway problems continued. Water storage began in 1919. Eventually the spillway walls and floor were built of wood timbers to allow for movement.  Work was complete in 1921.  As originally built, Lake Sherburne impounded   behind the  dam.

In 1960 the original spillway at the north end of the dam was filled in, victim of continuing slide activity, and a new spillway was built, using a circular overflow of the "morning glory" type out in the lake, discharging into the lower portion of the outlet works. The dam's crest was raised  to prevent overtopping during the projected maximum flood condition. The outlet works and spillway were raised at this time.

Operation
No minimum water release agreement applies to discharges from Lake Sherburne, with no effective flow in the creek from November through February.

See also
 Glacier View Dam, a much larger dam proposed in the 1940s on the west side of Glacier National Park

References

External links
 Lake Sherburne Dam at the Bureau of Reclamation
 Milk River Project at the Bureau of Reclamation

Buildings and structures in Glacier National Park (U.S.)
Dams in Montana
Buildings and structures in Glacier County, Montana
United States Bureau of Reclamation dams
Dams completed in 1921
1921 establishments in Montana